Stenobothrus is a genus of grasshoppers found in Asia, Europe, and North Africa.

Species
Species include:

References

 
Acrididae genera
Taxonomy articles created by Polbot